Micropera utriculosa is a species of orchid in the genus Micropera first described by Oakes Ames in 1915 under the name Camarotis utriculosa. It is endemic to the Philippines.

References

External links
IOSPE orchid photos
Swiss Orchid Foundation at the Herbarium Jany Renz, Micropera utriculosa (Ames) Garay
Discover Life, Micropera utriculosa, atlanta botanical garden, fulton county, georgia 1

utriculosa
Aeridinae
Plants described in 1915
Endemic orchids of the Philippines